The narrow-winged pipistrelle (Pipistrellus stenopterus) is a species of vesper bat. It can be found in Brunei Darussalam, Indonesia, and Malaysia.

References

Mammals of Indonesia
Fauna of Sumatra
Bats of Malaysia
Mammals of Thailand
Mammals of the Philippines
Pipistrellus
Taxa named by George Edward Dobson
Mammals described in 1875
Taxonomy articles created by Polbot